The following is a list of characters that have appeared in the television series The Batman, which ran from September 11, 2004, to March 22, 2008. The animation style bares a strong resemblance to that of Jackie Chan Adventures, since Jeff Matsuda was the chief character designer for both shows. Many of the supervillains who appear in the series, like the Joker, Penguin and Riddler, are very different from their comic counterparts, and notable foes of Batman such as Two-Face, Scarecrow, Ra's al Ghul, and Mad Hatter are absent from the series altogether. While many characters adapted from the mainstream DC comics appear, some of them only did in the show's tie-in comic called The Batman Strikes. Characters that were planned for a guest appearance but ultimately did not appear were Wonder Woman, Bizarro, Vigilante, and Owlman.

Main characters

Supporting characters

Antagonists

Additional characters

External links
 The Batman at The World's Finest

References

Characters
Batman
Batman
Batman
Batman